Antonio López Habas (born 28 May 1957) is a Spanish professional football manager and former player who played as a defender.

Playing career
Born in Pozoblanco, Córdoba, López had an unassuming career as a professional footballer, appearing in 48 La Liga matches over four seasons, eight of those for Sevilla to where he arrived in 1977 from local amateurs Pozoblanco, first being assigned to the B team.

He also represented Real Murcia, Burgos and Atlético Madrid (no appearances for the latter), retiring from the game at only 29 years of age due to a knee injury. In 1981–82 he scored an astonishing 13 goals in 32 games for Burgos, which nonetheless suffered Segunda División relegation due to financial irregularities.

Coaching career
López started coaching in the early 1990s, with Atlético's reserves. After one season apiece in amateur football, also in the Madrid area, he took charge of the Bolivia national team, first as an assistant to Xabier Azkargorta, and eventually appeared with it them as head coach at two Copa América tournaments. He then returned to club action with Club Bolívar, followed by a spell in his homeland with Lleida in the second tier – whilst at the Catalan side, he briefly accumulated with his work as the national coach of the South American country, which he left for good in 1997 to sign with Sporting de Gijón of the Spanish second tier, being dismissed shortly after his arrival.

Three years after his last job, with Club Bolívar, López was hired by Valencia as assistant to Rafael Benítez. However, after the sacking of Italian Claudio Ranieri, he managed the first team for 14 games as the Che, the previous league champions, eventually finished seventh. Additionally, he worked at the Mestalla Stadium as youth system coordinator.

López became Tenerife's second head coach of the following campaign in November 2005, being fired himself after only six second-division matches. Two years later, he joined Hristo Stoichkov's staff at Celta in the same tier. With the Galicians constantly battling relegation until the last month of competition, he was named interim coach for the final three months as the team eventually stayed afloat; he was the third manager for the club in approximately one year, after replacing Juan Ramón López Caro.

In 2010–11 López, who was assistant to Stoichkov at Mamelodi Sundowns of the South African Premier Division, took over the reins of the senior team. They made their best-ever start to a season and topped the standings at the end of the first round, eventually staying in contention for the league title until the second-last match; he resigned in February citing personal reasons, and went back to Spain. 

In January 2012, López was appointed director of the Target Football Academy in Bangkok, Thailand. On 13 July he signed for South African club Bidvest Wits, agreeing to a two-year contract but leaving on 4 January of the following year.

In August 2014, after a short spell in Atlético Madrid's youth system, López was named coach of ATK in the Indian Super League. On 25 October he was given a four-match suspension and fined  for his involvement in a spat with Goa's Robert Pires, which was reduced to two upon appeal.

After a dip in form from midway through the season, López led his team to the semi-finals by drawing with Goa, meeting the same opponent once again and defeating them on penalties. In the decisive match, against Kerala Blasters, he benched marquee player Luis García and also-compatriot Jofre, for which he was praised by critics, and the side won thanks to a goal by Mohammed Rafique in extra time.

On 25 April 2016, López was appointed at fellow league club Pune City. On 16 September 2017, after a run-in with the board of directors, he left his position.

In May 2019, López returned to ATK. On 14 March 2020, in a final played behind closed doors, he won the national championship against Chennaiyin to become the first manager to achieve the feat twice with the same team.

López signed with the newly formed ATK Mohun Bagan on 15 March 2020. In his first season his side finished level with Mumbai City in the first stage, but pushed down to second place on head-to-head points and lost the final 2–1. On 3 April 2021, he agreed to a one-year contract extension.

On 18 December 2021, López resigned after a poor run of results.

Managerial statistics

Honours

Player
Murcia
Segunda División: 1982–83

Manager
Bolivia
Copa América runner-up: 1997

ATK
Indian Super League: 2014, 2019–20

References

External links

Target Academy profile
Official website

1957 births
Living people
Spanish footballers
Footballers from Andalusia
Association football defenders
La Liga players
Segunda División players
Segunda División B players
CD Pozoblanco players
Sevilla Atlético players
Sevilla FC players
Burgos CF (1936) footballers
Real Murcia players
Atlético Madrid footballers
Spanish football managers
La Liga managers
Segunda División managers
Segunda División B managers
Tercera División managers
Atlético Madrid B managers
UE Lleida managers
Sporting de Gijón managers
Valencia CF managers
CD Tenerife managers
RC Celta de Vigo managers
Mamelodi Sundowns F.C. managers
Indian Super League head coaches
ATK (football club) head coaches
FC Pune City managers
ATK Mohun Bagan FC managers
Bolivia national football team managers
1995 Copa América managers
1997 Copa América managers
Spanish expatriate football managers
Expatriate football managers in Bolivia
Expatriate soccer managers in South Africa
Expatriate football managers in India
Spanish expatriate sportspeople in Bolivia
Spanish expatriate sportspeople in South Africa
Spanish expatriate sportspeople in India